UFC Fight Night: Overeem vs. Oleinik (also known as UFC Fight Night 149 or  UFC on ESPN+ 7) was a mixed martial arts event produced by the Ultimate Fighting Championship held on April 20, 2019 at Yubileyny Sports Palace in Saint Petersburg, Russia.

Background
The event marked the promotion's first visit to Saint Petersburg and the second in Russia, after UFC Fight Night: Hunt vs. Oleinik in September 2018.

A heavyweight bout between former Bellator Heavyweight Champion Alexander Volkov and the 2010 K-1 World Grand Prix Champion and former Strikeforce Heavyweight Champion Alistair Overeem was planned to serve as the event headliner. However, Volkov pulled out of the bout due to health issues and was replaced by Aleksei Oleinik.

Emil Weber Meek was briefly connected to a welterweight bout against Sultan Aliev at the event. However, Meek withdrew from the card for an undisclosed reason and was replaced by Keita Nakamura.

Promotional newcomer Roman Dolidze was briefly linked to a bout with Gadzhimurad Antigulov at the event. However, he was replaced just days later for undisclosed reasons by Michał Oleksiejczuk.

Promotional newcomer Roman Kopylov was scheduled to make his debut against Krzysztof Jotko at the event. However, Kopylov pulled out of the bout on March 22 citing injury and was replaced by promotional newcomer Alen Amedovski.

Muin Gaurov was scheduled to face Movsar Evloev at the event. However, it was reported on March 24 that Gaurov is still contracted with ONE Championship, thus his contract with UFC was annulled. Evloev instead faced promotional newcomer Seung Woo Choi.

Abdul-Kerim Edilov was scheduled to face Devin Clark at the event. However, Edilov was removed from the card for undisclosed reasons on March 25 and was replaced by promotional newcomer Ivan Shtyrkov. In turn, it was reported that the bout was canceled a day before the event after Shtyrkov was hospitalized.

Teemu Packalén was scheduled to face Alexander Yakovlev at the event. However, Packalén was removed from the card in early April for undisclosed reasons and was replaced by promotional newcomer Alex da Silva Coelho.

Results

Bonus awards
The following fighters were awarded $50,000 bonuses:
Fight of the Night: Islam Makhachev vs. Arman Tsarukyan    
Performance of the Night: Sergei Pavlovich and Magomed Mustafaev

See also 

 List of UFC events
 2019 in UFC
 List of current UFC fighters

References 

UFC Fight Night
2019 in mixed martial arts
Mixed martial arts in Russia
Sports competitions in Saint Petersburg
2019 in Russian sport
April 2019 sports events in Russia